Crime on the Hill is a 1933 British mystery film directed by Bernard Vorhaus and starring Sally Blane, Nigel Playfair and Lewis Casson. The plot was based on a successful play by Jack de Leon and Jack Celestin. It was made by British International Pictures at Welwyn Studios in autumn 1933.

Plot
A man tries to clear the name of his uncle who is wrongly convicted of a murdering the squire in a picturesque English village.

Cast
 Sally Blane - Sylvia Kennett 
 Nigel Playfair - Doctor Moody 
 Lewis Casson - Reverend Michael Gray 
 Anthony Bushell - Tony Fields 
 Phyllis Dare - Claire Winslow 
 Judy Kelly - Alice Green 
 George Merritt - Inspector Wolf 
 Hal Gordon - Sergeant Granger 
 Gus McNaughton - Collins 
 Jimmy Godden - Landlord 
 Hay Petrie - Jevons 
 Kenneth Kove - Tourist 
 Reginald Purdell - Reporter
 James Knight - Newspaper editor
 Norma Varden - Editor's secretary

References

Bibliography
 Richards, Jeffrey (ed.) The Unknown 1930s: An Alternative History of the British Cinema, 1929-1939. I.B. Tauris, 1998.

External links

1933 films
British mystery films
Films shot at Welwyn Studios
1930s English-language films
Films directed by Bernard Vorhaus
Films with screenplays by Bernard Vorhaus
British black-and-white films
1933 mystery films
1930s British films